Hwajeong Station is a station on the Ilsan Line in Goyang, Gyeonggi-do. It boasts the highest ridership out of all stations on the Ilsan Line section of Line 3. The District Office of Deogyang-gu is located to the north. It is located in the heart of a thriving zone for shopping and restaurants with E-Mart, Lotte Mart, and McDonald's located near the station.

Station layout

Vicinity
Exit 1: Hwajeong Express Bus Terminal, Baegyang Elementary & Middle Schools
Exit 2: Hwajeong Elementary & Middle Schools, SaveZone
Exit 3: Deogyang District Office, Hwajeong High School, LotteMart
Exit 4: Buyeong APT, CGV

References 

Seoul Metropolitan Subway stations
Railway stations opened in 1996
Metro stations in Goyang
Seoul Subway Line 3